Patrik Štefan (born 16 September 1980) is a Czech former professional ice hockey player who was drafted first overall by the Atlanta Thrashers in the 1999 NHL Entry Draft.

Playing career
Prior to being drafted by the Thrashers, Štefan played for Sparta Praha in the Czech Republic, and the Long Beach Ice Dogs of the IHL.

Štefan played six seasons for the Atlanta Thrashers scoring 177 points. During the 2004–05 NHL lockout, Štefan played for Ilves Tampere in the SM-liiga. In 37 games, Štefan collected a total of 41 points including 28 assists. In the playoffs, Štefan had six assists and a goal in seven games.

On 24 June 2006, Štefan was traded to the Dallas Stars along with Jaroslav Modrý for Niko Kapanen and a 7th round draft pick in 2006.

Empty net blunder
Štefan earned significant notoriety on 4 January 2007 for a blunder during a game against the Edmonton Oilers. With seconds left in the game, and Dallas already ahead by a goal, Štefan gained possession of the puck and found himself on a breakaway towards an empty net. Štefan continued skating towards the crease rather than immediately shooting, then attempted a casual backhand into the net from close quarters. The puck hit bad ice and bounced up and over his stick, causing him to miss the goal, trip, and fall against the ice. To compound the error, he then cleared the puck in the direction of the Oilers. This allowed a play to develop where fellow Czech Aleš Hemský scored with two seconds remaining to tie the game 5-5; ultimately, Dallas won in a shootout.

After Štefan's contract expired in 2007, the Dallas Stars chose not to re-sign him. Štefan signed with SC Bern of the Nationalliga A, but he only played three games for them before retiring in October 2007, largely due to a serious hip injury, the latest of several chronic injuries that plagued his career. He is currently a player agent in the Detroit area, and a youth coach with 15U Little Caesars Hockey.

Career statistics

Regular season and playoffs

International

Honours and achievements
 Won silver medal at 2006 IIHF World Championship

See also
 List of NHL first overall draft choices

References

External links
 

1980 births
Living people
Atlanta Thrashers draft picks
Atlanta Thrashers players
Chicago Wolves players
Czech ice hockey centres
Dallas Stars players
HC Sparta Praha players
Ilves players
Long Beach Ice Dogs (IHL) players
National Hockey League first-overall draft picks
National Hockey League first-round draft picks
Sportspeople from Příbram
SC Bern players
Czech expatriate ice hockey players in Switzerland
Czech expatriate ice hockey players in the United States
Czech expatriate ice hockey players in Finland